Ethmia circumdatella is a moth in the family Depressariidae. It is found in South Africa.

References

Endemic moths of South Africa
Moths described in 1863
circumdatella
Moths of Africa